Karl Gottlieb Wilhelm Bötticher (29 May 1806, Nordhausen – 19 June 1889, Berlin) was a German archaeologist who specialized in architecture.

Biography
He was born in Nordhausen. He studied at the Academy of Architecture in Berlin, and was afterwards appointed an instructor in the School of Design of the Industrial Institute there. In 1844, he was appointed a professor of tectonics (architectonics) at the Academy of Architecture.

In 1853, he received his doctorate from the University of Greifswald, and later worked as a lecturer at the University of Berlin (until 1862). In 1868, he was appointed director of the sculpture department at the Berlin Museum.

Works
His chief work is the "Tektonik der Hellenen" (Architectonics of the Greeks; 1844–52), a contribution to the study of Ancient Greek architecture. Others of his works are:
 Holzarchitektur des Mittelalters (Wooden architecture of the Middle Ages; 1835–41).
 Das grab des Dionysos. An der marmorbasis zu Dresden, (1858).
 Der Omphalos des Zeus zu Delphi, (1859)
 Bericht über die Untersuchungen auf der Akropolis in Athen (1863).
 Der Zophoros am Parthenon (1875).
 Die Thymele der Athena Nike auf der Akropolis von Athen (1880).

Notes

References

 Breitschmid, Markus. Can architectural art-form be designed out of construction? Carl Boetticher, Gottfried Semper, and Heinrich Woelfflin: a sketch of various investigations on the nature of "Tectonic" in nineteenth-century architectural theory, (Blacksburg: Architecture Edition, 2004). 

1806 births
1889 deaths
Archaeologists from Thuringia
People of the Antikensammlung Berlin
Directors of museums in Germany
People from Nordhausen, Thuringia
Members of the Göttingen Academy of Sciences and Humanities